Ego: Echo is the fourth album by French post-rock band Ulan Bator. It was produced by Michael Gira, former member of the band Swans and head of Young God Records. The album was recorded in Italy at Emme Studio in Calenzano, Toscana.

Track listing
"Hemisphere"  – 8:42
"Santa Lucia"  (part 1+2) – 6:14
"Etoile Astre"  – 4:32
"Let Go Ego"  – 16:10
"Hiver"  – 3:57
"Selva"  – 1:40
"La Joueuse de Tambour"  – 6:34
"Soeur Violence"  (part 1+2) – 6:25
"Echo"  (Part 1+2+3) – 10:06
all songs Cambuzat/Manchion

Musicians 
Amaury Cambuzat: voice, guitar, piano, organ...
Olivier Manchion: bass, electronics, backward vocals...
Matteo Dainese: drums

Guest musicians
Jean-Hervé Péron (Faust): French horn, trumpet (Soeur Violence #2)
Michael Gira: voice (La Joueuse De Tambour, Soeur Violence #2)

References

External links
Official Page at Young God Records

2000 albums
Ulan Bator (band) albums
Young God Records albums
Albums produced by Michael Gira

fr:Ulan Bator
it:Ulan Bator (gruppo musicale)